Neoplan Bus GmbH is a German automotive company that manufactures buses, trolleybuses and coaches. It is a subsidiary of MAN Truck & Bus SE.

History

Foundations

The company was founded by Gottlob Auwärter in Stuttgart in 1935, and manufactured bodywork for bus and truck chassis. By 1953, the company had moved away from manufacturing buses on truck chassis, to a partial monocoque design with a steel tube skeleton, providing the structural support, enhanced by welded side panels. The engine was moved to the rear. In 1957, air suspension was made available.

1960s
In 1961, a new bus design, the Typ Hamburg, was unveiled at the Geneva Motor Show. Developed by the founder's eldest son, Albrecht Auwärter, and another student, Swiss national Bob Lee, as part of their dissertation at Hamburg University. The design was the first bus to allow passengers to regulate their fresh air supply through a nozzle from two air ducts, commonly seen in contemporary designs, as well as offering air suspension.

Both Albrecht and Lee joined Neoplan after graduating from the university. Albrecht took over management of the company in 1965, and Bob Lee later became head of Engineering and Design.

In 1964, the founder's second son, Konrad Auwärter, developed a double-deck bus design for a service bus as part of his dissertation. The "Do-Bus" design had low weight, and could carry over 100 passengers. It also featured a low-frame front axle with forward-mounted steering gear that permitted a low, flat floor. The double-deck principle was applied to the coach design, creating a high-capacity comfortable touring vehicle. This vehicle was known as the Skyliner.

1970s–1980s
In 1971, the Cityliner was introduced to the public. This design had a passenger platform above the driver's cab, and included an onboard toilet. The vehicle also made use of glass-fibre reinforced plastic for certain areas of the body; this was the first instance when this technique was used. 

A second manufacturing facility opened in Pilsting in 1973, and a third opened in Kumasi, Ghana in December 1974 to support increasing orders.

Several more plants were added in the 1980s, including two in the United States. The United States plants were later spun off into a separate, and now defunct, independent company (Neoplan USA) that used the Neoplan name under licence.

1990s-2000s
Further manufacturing facilities were opened during the 1990s and 2000s.

The Starliner was introduced in 1996, and would go on to win the Bus of the Year award for two consecutive years – in 1998 and 1999.

In 1999 the company unveiled a prototype fuel cell bus.

In 2001, Neoplan, or correctly, "Gottlob Auwärter GmbH & Co KG" was acquired by MAN AG subsidiary MAN Nutzfahrzeuge AG to form Neoman Bus GmbH. The Starliner won the Bus of the Year award for two more consecutive years in 2001 and 2002.

In 2007, a new Auwärter Museum was opened in Landau an der Isar.

On 1 February 2008, Neoman Bus GmbH was fully integrated into the bus division of the larger MAN Nutzfahrzeuge Group, and ceased to exist in its own right. Neoplan and MAN Truck & Bus began operating as two separate but integrated marques of MAN Nutzfahrzeuge Group.

Accidents
On 28 May 2008, in Japan one of two Neoplan Megaliners operated by West JR Bus Company caught fire while in service, and burnt down completely. No passengers were injured. The company resumed operations with its second Megaliner in July 2008.

On 16 March 2009, in Japan one of two Megaliners operated by JR Kanto Bus Company caught fire on an overnight Seishun Mega-Dream Go service between Osaka and Tokyo. The 77 passengers and driver evacuated safely before the coach was completely destroyed. Following this accident, both operators suspended operations of the remaining two Megaliners in Japan.

Products

Buses 

 Electroliner (electric trolleybus)
Neoplan Airliner (airport apron bus, 1960–present)
Tropicliner

Discontinued models 

Centroliner (low-floor bus; 1997-2009)
 Typ Hamburg (1961)
Megaliner
Jumbocruiser
 Cityliner (1971)
Jetliner (1973)
Spaceliner
 Skyliner 67 (1965)
 Metroliner
 Starliner C/L
Transliner
 Trendliner
 Euroliner
 Megashuttle

See also

Neoplan USA, defunct US subsidiary
2013 Podgorica bus crash

References

External links

 
 

 
Vehicle manufacturing companies established in 1935
Bus manufacturers of Germany
Trolleybus manufacturers
German brands
MAN SE
1935 establishments in Germany